Lisette Lorena Vergara Riquelme (born 14 September 1992) is a Chilean teacher who was elected as a member of the Chilean Constitutional Convention.

References

External links
 Profile at Lista del Pueblo

1992 births
Living people
Chilean people
People from Quilpué
University of Playa Ancha alumni
21st-century Chilean politicians
21st-century Chilean women politicians
Members of the List of the People
Members of the Chilean Constitutional Convention